Robert O. Bonow is an American cardiologist, currently the Max and Lilly Goldberg Distinguished Professor of Cardiology at Northwestern University Feinberg School of Medicine and also Editor-in-Chief of JAMA's JAMA Cardiology.  He received his MD at the University of Pennsylvania in 1973.

References

Northwestern University faculty
Perelman School of Medicine at the University of Pennsylvania alumni
American cardiologists
Living people
Year of birth missing (living people)